The 2007 WNBA Finals was the championship series of the 2007 WNBA season, and the conclusion of the season's playoffs. The  Phoenix Mercury, top-seeded champions of the Western Conference, defeated the Detroit Shock, top-seeded champions of the Eastern Conference, three games to two in a best-of-five series. This was Phoenix's first ever professional basketball title.

2007 marked the first time in WNBA history that the series was won on the opponent's home floor. The Mercury beat the Shock in Detroit. The Shock made their third appearance in the Finals in five years. The Mercury appeared in the Finals for the second time since in franchise history.

Going into the series, the Shock had won two championships, tied with the Los Angeles Sparks for second most in WNBA history. The now defunct Houston Comets hold the record with four championships won.

The Shock's 24–10 record gave them home court advantage over Phoenix (23–11). It did not matter, however, as the Mercury won game five on the Shock's home floor and became champions of the WNBA.

Road to the finals

Regular season series
The Detroit Shock won both games in the regular season series:

Game summaries
All times listed below are Eastern Daylight Time.

Game 1

The Detroit Shock shook off the absence of their interior star Cheryl Ford and held off the run-and-gun Phoenix Mercury in a wild 108–100 victory in Game 1 of the WNBA finals. Detroit outrebounded Phoenix 48-30 and scored often on putbacks and other high-percentage shots. The Shock's bench outscored Phoenix's 50–12.

Penny Taylor scored 32 points and Cappie Pondexter had 27 to lead the Mercury, who struggled when All-Star Diana Taurasi missed significant stretches of the game with foul trouble.

Taurasi, who averaged 20 points in the Mercury's first four playoff games and 25 during the regular season, was held scoreless in the first half. She scored a quick nine points in the third before being whistled for a loose ball foul with 5:37 to go in the quarter. The contact on Detroit's Katie Smith resulted in Taurasi's fifth foul and she sat on the bench for the remainder of the quarter. Taurasi fouled out with two minutes remaining in the game. She finished with 10 points in 22 minutes.

Game 2

Diana Taurasi bounced back from her woeful Game 1 with 30 points to help the Mercury even the five-game series. During Game 2, she stayed out of foul trouble and scored from all over the court, including seven 3-pointers. Taurasi's long 3 made it 76–44 with less than 3 minutes to play in the third quarter and capped a 15–2 Mercury run. She also had eight rebounds and three assists.

Taurasi's inspired play helped offset the return of forward Cheryl Ford to Detroit's lineup. The four-time All-Star, who missed the first game with a left knee injury, had five points and seven rebounds, but played less than half the game.

Phoenix outscored Detroit in the first three quarters and played most of the fourth without its starters. The Mercury led by as many as 34 and were ahead for the final 37 minutes of the game.

Game 3

Katie Smith scored 22 points, one shy of her career playoff high, to help the defending champions beat the cold-shooting Mercury 88–83 and take a 2–1 lead in the WNBA finals.

The 33-year-old Detroit forward, in her 12th pro season, made 4-of-8 3-pointers, 3-for-4 in an 11-point third quarter. Phoenix, meanwhile, shot 35 percent, including a miserable 5-for-31 on 3s, in front of a loud home crowd of 12,024.

Deanna Nolan, who scored 20, sank a crucial 3-pointer with 1:53 to go, then sealed the victory with four consecutive free throws in the final 8.3 seconds. Diana Taurasi scored 22 for the Mercury. Tangela Smith scored 17 but made only 6 of 17 shots for Phoenix. She was 0-for-6 on 3s. Penny Taylor was in foul trouble most of the night but still played 33 minutes and had 16 points and 14 rebounds for the Mercury.

Game 4

With the poor-shooting Phoenix Mercury on the verge of elimination, coach Paul Westhead decided to run the offense through Cappie Pondexter. Pondexter scored a game-high 26 points, including a driving bank shot with 21 seconds to play, and the Phoenix Mercury defeated the Detroit Shock 77–76 to force a deciding fifth game in the WNBA finals.

The Mercury will try to become the first team in WNBA history to win a title on the road. Detroit, which won championships in 2003 and 2006, goes home to the Palace of Auburn Hills, where it is 5–1 this postseason. The only loss was a 28-point rout by the Mercury in Game 2.

Phoenix shot 34.7 percent from the floor in an 88–83 loss in Game 3 - matching the worst shooting percentage in Westhead's two seasons as head coach. The Mercury came out just as cold this time, hitting two of their first 11 shots and finishing the first period 5-for-18 (27.8 percent). But Detroit was even more out of sync, and the Mercury went on a 14–4 run late in the first quarter and early in the second to take a 22–14 lead. The Shock found their rhythm in the second quarter, hitting 9-of-19 shots to take a 35–33 halftime lead. But they had missed an opportunity to bury the Mercury.

Game 5

A fast start helped Phoenix become the first team in the WNBA's 11-year history to claim the title on the road. Cappie Pondexter, in her second year in the league, scored 26 points and was chosen as the series MVP. Penny Taylor scored 30 points and Diana Taurasi had 17 for the Mercury.

The Shock lost the last two games of the series, ending their bid to win back-to-back titles. Detroit also won the championship in 2003.

Phoenix took some steam out of the home crowd, announced at more than 22,000, by surging to a 20–9 lead midway through the first quarter. Taurasi had eight points, including two 3-pointers, in that stretch. The large deficit quickly took Detroit out of its game. The Mercury's smallest lead in the second half was nine points. Katie Smith had 18 points for Detroit, which committed 17 turnovers compared to only nine for the Mercury.

This was the Mercury's first WNBA championship. They previously appeared in the WNBA Finals in 1998.

Awards
 2007 WNBA Champion: Phoenix Mercury
 Finals MVP: Cappie Pondexter

Rosters

{| class="toccolours" style="font-size: 95%; width: 100%;"
|-
! colspan="2" style="background-color: #00008B; color: #D3D3D3; text-align: center;" | 2007 Detroit Shock Finals roster
|- style="background-color: #DC143C;color: #FFFFFF; text-align: center;"
! Players !! Coaches
|-
| valign="top" |
{| class="sortable" style="background:transparent; margin:0px; width:100%;"
! Pos. !! # !! Nat. !! Name !! Height !! Weight !!class="unsortable"| !! From
|-

{| class="toccolours" style="font-size: 95%; width: 100%;"
|-
! colspan="2" style="background-color: #4B0082; color: #FFFF00; text-align: center;" | 2007 Phoenix Mercury Finals roster
|- style="background-color: #DC143C;color: #FFFFFF; text-align: center;"
! Players !! Coaches
|-
| valign="top" |
{| class="sortable" style="background:transparent; margin:0px; width:100%;"
! Pos. !! # !! Nat. !! Name !! Height !! Weight !!class="unsortable"| !! From
|-

References

Finals
Detroit Shock
Phoenix Mercury
WNBA Finals
WNBA Finals
Women's National Basketball Association Finals
WNBA Finals
2000s in Phoenix, Arizona
Basketball competitions in Phoenix, Arizona
Basketball competitions in Michigan